"More to Life" is a theme-song to the early 1990s Trainer TV series. The song was written by Simon May and Mike Read. The theme won them a TRIC award for Best TV Theme.

Sung by Cliff Richard, it was released as a single in the UK in September 1991 and reached number 23 on the UK Singles Chart.

Track listing
UK 7" single (EM 205), CD single (CDEM 205), cassette (TCEM 205)
"More to Life"
"Mo's Theme" (instrumental)

Chart performance

References

1991 songs
1991 singles
Cliff Richard songs
Songs written by Mike Read
EMI Records singles